Carlos Francisco José de Borja Cabral da Câmara Ribeiro Ferreira (born 2 May 1931) is a Portuguese former sailor who competed in the 1960 Summer Olympics and in the 1964 Summer Olympics.

References

1931 births
Living people
Portuguese male sailors (sport)
Olympic sailors of Portugal
Sailors at the 1960 Summer Olympics – Dragon
Sailors at the 1964 Summer Olympics – Dragon